The Confession of Faith of the Evangelical United Brethren Church is one of five established Doctrinal Standards of the United Methodist Church, along with the Articles of Religion, the General Rules of United Societies, the Standard Sermons of John Wesley, and John Wesley's Explanatory Notes on the New Testament. The United Methodist Church adopted the Confession of Faith in 1968 when the Methodist Church merged with the Evangelical United Brethren Church to form the United Methodist Church.  The Confession of Faith covers much of the same ground as the Articles of Religion, but it is shorter and the language is more contemporary.  The Confession of Faith also contains an article on the Judgment and Future State (derived from the Augsburg Confession) which had not been present in the Methodist Articles of Religion.

Text

Notes

References

20th-century Christian texts
Christian statements of faith
United Methodist Church